Allegheny-Clarion Valley School District (ACVSD) is a small, rural, public school district in western Pennsylvania. It spans portions of four counties and is the only Pennsylvania public school district to do so. The district is one of the 500 public school districts of Pennsylvania. In Armstrong County it covers the City of Parker and Hovey Township. In Butler County it serves Allegheny Township. In Clarion County it serves the Boroughs of Emlenton, Foxburg and St. Petersburg and Perry Township and Richland Township. In Venango County it serves the Borough of Emlenton and Richland Township and Scrubgrass Township. According to 2000 federal census data, Allegheny-Clarion Valley School District serves a resident population of 5,944. By 2010, the district's population declined to 5,749 people. In 2009, the district residents' per capita income was $15,525, while the median family income was $36,867. In the Commonwealth of Pennsylvania, the median family income was $49,501 and the United States median family income was $49,445, in 2010. By 2013, the median household income in the United States rose to $52,100.

The district operates:
 Allegheny-Clarion Valley Elementary School – Grades K-6
 Allegheny-Clarion Valley Jr./Sr. High School – Grades 7–12

Extracurriculars

Sports
The district funds:
Varsity

Boys
Baseball - A
Basketball- A
Cross Country - A
Football - A
Golf - AA
Track and Field - AA

Girls
Basketball - A
Cheer - AAAA
Cross Country - A
Golf - AA
Softball - A
Track and Field - AA
Volleyball - A

Junior High School Sports

Boys
Basketball
Cross Country
Football
Golf
Track and Field	

Girls
Basketball
Cross Country
Golf
Track and Field
Volleyball

According to PIAA directory July 2013

References

External links
 Allegheny-Clarion Valley School District
 PIAA

School districts in Armstrong County, Pennsylvania
School districts in Butler County, Pennsylvania
School districts in Clarion County, Pennsylvania
School districts in Venango County, Pennsylvania